The Capricorn lizardfish (Synodus capricornis) is a species of lizardfish that lives mainly in the Pacific Ocean.

Information
Synodus capricornis is known from marine environments within a demersal depth range of about 20 – 88 meters. This species is native to a subtropical climate. The average length that Synodus capricornis can grow to as an unsexed male is about 21 centimeters or about 8.26 inches. The species is recorded to occupy the areas of Pacific Ocean, Taiwan, Tonga, Hawaii, Easter Island, and Pitcairn. They are considered to be a benthic species. They are found at the sandy areas that surround reefs. Even though this species can be found in various locations, its common and most popular place to populate is in the Pacific Ocean. The Synodus capricornus is recorded to be a resilient species that was able to double its population in fifteen months.

Common names
The common names for the Synodus capricornis are as follows:
Hawaiian : 'Ulae 
French : anoli à Capricorn
English : Capricorn lizardfish 
Spanish : lagarto dos Capricorn 
Mandarin Chinese : 羊角狗母魚

Classification
The taxonomic classification of the Synodus capricornis is as follows:
Kingdom: Animalia
Subkingdom: Bilateria
Branch: Deuterostomia
Infrakingdom: Chordonia
Phylum: Chordata
Subphylum: Vertebrata 
Infraphylum: Gnathostomata 
Superclass: Osteichthyes 
Class: Osteichthyes 
Subclass: Actinopterygii 
Infraclass: Actinopteri 
Cohort: Clupeocephala 
Order: Aulopiformes 
Family: Synodontidae 
Subfamily: Synodontinae 
Genus: Synodus
Specific name: capricornis 
Scientific name: Synodus capricornis

References

Notes
 

Capricorn lizardfish
Fish of the Pacific Ocean
Capricorn lizardfish